In general relativity, the Weyl–Lewis–Papapetrou coordinates are a set of coordinates, used in the solutions to the vacuum region surrounding an axisymmetric distribution of mass–energy. They are named for Hermann Weyl, Thomas Lewis, and Achilles Papapetrou.

Details
The square of the line element is of the form:

where (t, ρ, ϕ, z) are the cylindrical Weyl–Lewis–Papapetrou coordinates in 3 + 1 spacetime, and λ, ν, ω, and B, are unknown functions of the spatial non-angular coordinates ρ and z only. Different authors define the functions of the coordinates differently.

See also
Introduction to the mathematics of general relativity
Stress–energy tensor
Metric tensor (general relativity)
Relativistic angular momentum
Weyl metrics

References

Further reading

Selected papers

Selected books

Metric tensors
Spacetime
Coordinate charts in general relativity
General relativity
Gravity